Anna Svane (c. 1573–1637) was a Danish merchant.

Biography
Anna Hansdatter Svane was born at Ribe, the daughter of Hans Svaning and Marine Sørensdatter Stage. Her grandfather was historian Hans Svaning (c. 1500–1584) whose surname was subsequently altered to Svane. In 1590, she was married to the mayor of Horsens, burgher merchant Hans Olufsen Riber (d. 1615). The couple had seven children, two of whom died as infants. Her daughter Anne Svane (c. 1596) was married to mayor of Horsens Ernst von Baden. One son Oluf Svane (c. 1601) became mayor of Horsens. Her youngest son Hans Svane (1606–1668) would become Bishop of the Diocese of Zealand.

After the death of her spouse, she took over his business and managed his properties in Horsens. She became a leading member of the then growing wealthy Danish burgher class. During the sack of Jutland by German troops during the Thirty Years' War in 1627-29, she fled to her son Hans in Frisia.

In 1631, she founded a home for poor widows called Svaneboligen at Fugholm 16 in Horsens. The foundation was the first of its kind in Horsens and belonged to the first institutions of its kind in Denmark. Anna Svane died at Horsens in 1637 and was buried at Horsens Klosterkirke.

References

1637 deaths
People from Ribe
People from Horsens
Danish philanthropists
Danish women philanthropists
Danish merchants
17th-century Danish businesspeople
Year of birth uncertain
17th-century Danish businesswomen